Ostos is a Spanish surname. Notable people with the surname include:

 César Augusto Verástegui Ostos (born 1966), Mexican politician
 Luis Gerardo Ostos (born 1962), Mexican entrepreneur, Mexico and U.S.
 Javier Ostos Mora (1916-2008), Mexican lawyer
 Julio Ostos (born 1953), Venezuelan chess master
 Raymond Munoz Ostos (born 1963), American, Spanish-Mexican U.S. Army Military Officer
 Luis Ostos (born 1992), Peruvian long-distance runner

Spanish-language surnames